The Journal of Semantics is a leading international peer-reviewed journal of semantics of natural languages published by Oxford University Press. Its current editor is Rick Nouwen of Utrecht University. The journal is available online with subscription via Oxford Journals.

References

1992 establishments in England
Publications established in 1982
Semantics journals
English-language journals
Oxford University Press academic journals